Blockbuster is a 2019 original dramatic podcast created by Matt Schrader detailing the friendship and rise of early Steven Spielberg and George Lucas in the 1970s Hollywood.

The series is structured like a biopic film in the years before Spielberg and Lucas came to prominence as they struggled to complete Jaws (1975) and Star Wars (1977), as well as Close Encounters (1977). It also follows the rise of composer John Williams in the years following the death of his wife, when he earned his first Academy Awards for his original scores.

The series stars Ray Chase, Max Mittelman, Matthew Bohrer, Lex Lang and Julia McIlvaine, and is narrated by Schrader, an Emmy Award-winning investigative journalist and documentary filmmaker.

Production 
The idea for Blockbuster began while Schrader was doing research for his film Score: A Film Music Documentary (2017). "We were really inspired in making the first scripted biopic for the podcast platform," Schrader said. "We took a large-scale 'feature film' approach to research, script development, casting, design and music, and really wanted to create a 2.5-hour movie for your ears."

The script and story for Blockbuster were finished in July 2018, according to the "making of" interviews at the end of each episode of the series. From August 2018 to April 2019, Schrader and film sound designer Peter Bawiec worked together with composers Ryan Taubert and Benjamin Botkin.

Notably, Blockbuster forgoes traditional in-episode advertisements for a more immersive experience, and instead asks listeners to consider voluntarily supporting the production via its own website.

Voice actors Ray Chase and Max Mittelman were cast to play George and Steven, respectively. Also cast were television actor Matthew Bohrer (John Williams), Lex Lang (Harrison Ford), Julia McIlvaine (Marcia Lucas), and Kenny Holmes (Sylvester Stallone).

Episodes 
Blockbuster premiered on all podcast platforms on April 16, 2019, and was featured by Apple Podcasts upon its release and on strategic dates, including "May The Fourth."

The six episodes of Blockbuster use a Roman numeral format as part of the title, similar to the names of the Star Wars films.

Each episode follows a chronological narrative structure over the years 1971 to 1977, with an occasional flashback scene. These flashback scenes include the world premiere of King Kong (1933) at The Chinese Theatre, 10-year-old George Lucas falling in love with Flash Gordon reruns on KRON-TV, and Steven Spielberg's first experience seeing a meteor shower with his father.

The episodes released weekly, and were preceded by an orchestral music-only track titled "Overture."

Music 
The original score for Blockbuster employs the use of leitmotif as themes for each major character, including Steven's Theme, George's Theme and John's Theme. Schrader says he hoped to unlock a John Williams feeling in the music without imitating directly. It also merges these for dramatic effect in scenes to create unique situations and settings. Composers Ryan Taubert and Benjamin Botkin's score was praised as an immersive elements that takes listeners "into movie land" of the 1970s. Select tracks from the original score were made available as bonus content to supporters of the series.

Reception 
The series was announced April 11 in The Hollywood Reporter, and became a Top 10 series on Apple Podcasts during its initial release. Blockbuster was received with positive reviews. The podcast won "Creativity Podcast of the Year" at the 2019 and 2020 Adweek Podcast Awards.

References 

Infotainment
Audio podcasts
2019 podcast debuts